The Lakes District Health Board (Lakes DHB) was a district health board that provided healthcare to the area covered by Taupō and Rotorua districts in New Zealand. In July 2022, the Lakes DHB was merged into the national health service Te Whatu Ora (Health New Zealand).

History
The Lakes District Health Board, like most other district health boards, came into effect on 1 January 2001 established by the New Zealand Public Health and Disability Act 2000.

On 1 July 2022, the Lakes DHB and the other district health boards were disestablished, with Te Whatu Ora (Health New Zealand) assuming their former functions and operations including hospitals and health services. The Lakes DHB's functions and operations were subsumed into Te Whatu Ora's Te Manawa Taki division.

Geographic area
The area covered by the Lakes District Health Board is defined in Schedule 1 of the New Zealand Public Health and Disability Act 2000 and based on territorial authority and ward boundaries as constituted as at 1 January 2001. The area can be adjusted through an Order in Council.

Governance
The initial board was fully appointed. Since the 2001 local elections, the board has been partially elected (seven members) and in addition, up to four members get appointed by the Minister of Health. The minister also appoints the chairperson and deputy-chair from the pool of eleven board members.

Demographics

Lakes DHB served a population of 109,080 at the 2018 New Zealand census, an increase of 10,890 people (11.1%) since the 2013 census, and an increase of 10,761 people (10.9%) since the 2006 census. There were 38,886 households. There were 53,670 males and 55,407 females, giving a sex ratio of 0.97 males per female. The median age was 38.1 years (compared with 37.4 years nationally), with 23,766 people (21.8%) aged under 15 years, 20,220 (18.5%) aged 15 to 29, 47,655 (43.7%) aged 30 to 64, and 17,439 (16.0%) aged 65 or older.

Ethnicities were 67.8% European/Pākehā, 36.6% Māori, 4.7% Pacific peoples, 7.9% Asian, and 1.7% other ethnicities. People may identify with more than one ethnicity.

The percentage of people born overseas was 17.4, compared with 27.1% nationally.

Although some people objected to giving their religion, 50.6% had no religion, 34.3% were Christian, 1.5% were Hindu, 0.3% were Muslim, 0.5% were Buddhist and 6.0% had other religions.

Of those at least 15 years old, 14,238 (16.7%) people had a bachelor or higher degree, and 16,194 (19.0%) people had no formal qualifications. The median income was $28,800, compared with $31,800 nationally. 11,406 people (13.4%) earned over $70,000 compared to 17.2% nationally. The employment status of those at least 15 was that 41,505 (48.6%) people were employed full-time, 13,392 (15.7%) were part-time, and 4,353 (5.1%) were unemployed.

Hospitals

Public hospitals

 Rotorua Hospital in Ohinemutu, Rotorua, Rotorua Lakes has 233 beds and provides children's health, maternity, surgical, medical, geriatric and mental health services.
 Taupo Hospital in Hilltop, Taupō, Taupo District has 36 beds and provides surgical, medical and maternity services.

Private hospitals

 Southern Cross Hospital Rotorua in Springfield, Rotorua, Rotorua Lakes has 17 beds and provides medical and surgical services.

Notes

References

District health boards in New Zealand
Rotorua Lakes District
Taupō District
2001 establishments in New Zealand
2022 disestablishments in New Zealand